Kanok Bannasan (OMF Publishers Thailand) (Thai: กนกบรรณสาร) is an evangelical publisher of Christian books in the Thai language.  Kanok is a non-profit ministry registered under the Evangelical Fellowship of Thailand.

History
Kankok Bannasan was founded in 1952 by missionaries from OMF International in order to provide Christian literature to support their evangelism and church planting work in Thailand. Originally under missionary control, Kanok is now independent under Thai leadership.  Their first Thai general manager was appointed in 2003.

Location
Kanok Bannasan's offices and bookshop are located at 86/122-4 Soi Tha Kham 28/1, Rama 2 Road, Khet Bang Khun Tian, Bangkok 10150, Thailand and their official website is https://kanokbannasan.org/

References

Christian organizations established in 1952
Christian publishing companies
Book publishing companies of Thailand
Christian publishers in Thailand
Protestantism in Thailand
1952 establishments in Thailand
Publishing companies established in 1952